Włodarczyk is a Polish surname. It may refer to:
 Agnieszka Włodarczyk (born 1980), Polish actress and singer
 Anita Włodarczyk (born 1985), Polish hammer thrower
 Anna Włodarczyk (born 1951), Polish athlete primarily known for the long jump
 Krzysztof Włodarczyk (born 1981), Polish boxer
 Piotr Włodarczyk (born 1977), Polish footballer
 Rafał Włodarczyk, Polish footballer
 Urszula Włodarczyk (born 1965), Polish heptathlete and triple jumper
 Wanda Włodarczyk (1925–2003), Polish fencer
 Wojciech Włodarczyk (born 1990), Polish volleyball player

Polish-language surnames